The 2010 FINA Women's Water Polo World Cup was the 15th edition of the event, organised by the world's governing body in aquatics, the International Swimming Federation (FINA). The event took place in Christchurch, New Zealand from 17 to 22 August 2010.

The United States won the gold medal by defeating Australia 6–3 in the final. China captured bronze, beating Russia 11–9.

Format
8 teams qualified for the 2010 FINA World Cup. They are split into two groups of 4 teams. After playing a Round-robin every team advanced to the quarterfinals. The best ranked team of Group A played against the fourth ranked team of Group B, the second ranked team of Group A against the third ranked team of Group B the third ranked team of Group A against the second ranked team of Group B and the fourth ranked team of Group A against the best ranked team of Group B. The winners of those quarterfinals advanced to the Semis and played out the champion while the losers of the quarterfinals competed in placement matches.

Groups

Preliminary round

Group A
All times are NZST (UTC+12)

Group B
All times are NZST (UTC+12)

Final round
5th–8th place bracket

5th–8th place classification 

All times are NZST (UTC+12)

7th place match 

All times are NZST (UTC+12)

5th place match 

All times are NZST (UTC+12)

Championship bracket

Quarterfinals 

All times are NZST (UTC+12)

Semifinals 

All times are NZST (UTC+12)

Bronze medal match 

All times are NZST (UTC+12)

Gold medal match 

All times are NZST (UTC+12)

Final standings

Team Roster
Betsey Armstrong, Anne Belden, Brenda Villa, Maggie Steffens, Juliet Moss, Courtney Mathewson, Lolo Silver, Elsie Windes, Kelly Rulon, Annika Dries, Kami Craig, Melissa Seidemann, Emily Feher. Head coach: Adam Krikorian.

Individual awards
Most Valuable Player

Best Goalkeeper

Best Scorer
 – 16 goals
Tournament team
 – Goalkeeper
 – Centre forward

References

External links
Official site 
FINA

F
W
FINA Women's Water Polo World Cup
International water polo competitions hosted by New Zealand
Water Polo World Cup
August 2010 sports events in New Zealand
Women's water polo in New Zealand
Sport in Christchurch